Last Scandal is a 2008 South Korean television series starring Choi Jin-sil, Jung Joon-ho, Jung Woong-in and Byun Jung-soo. It aired on MBC from March 8 to April 27, 2008 on Saturdays and Sundays at 21:40 for 16 episodes.

A romantic dramedy about a 39-year-old housewife who finds love with a top actor after a painful divorce, it was a modest hit on the small screen, with its final episode recording a 19.5% viewership rating.

Choi, one of South Korea's most beloved actresses, shocked the nation when she took her own life in October 2008, five months after the TV series ended.

Plot
Hong Sun-hee (Choi Jin-sil) is a 39-year-old housewife facing extreme financial difficulties due to her husband Ahn Yoo-shik's (Kim Byung-se) mounting debt. One day, Yoo-shik disappears, leaving Sun-hee to take care of the household. She later learns that he has married a rich woman. Now a single divorced mother with a thirteen-year-old daughter, Sun-hee runs into top actor Song Jae-bin (Jung Joon-ho) at a commercial shoot, and he turns out to be none other than her first boyfriend, Jang Dong-chul. Sun-hee was once the prettiest girl in high school, but in the years since she has let herself go and is now a middle-aged, plain-looking housewife, which is why Jae-bin doesn't recognize her at first. Greatly disappointed to find his first love so much changed, the egoistic, self-absorbed actor tries to avoid her. But the famous star is not without problems, either. To maintain his popularity, he deceives people about his age, background, history and even his name. Little wonder he is embarrassed to meet Sun-hee again, who knows all about his past. But Jae-bin's feelings change when Sun-hee moves into his home as a housekeeper and nanny to his nephew Hoon, son of his older brother and manager Dong-hwa (Jung Woong-in) and estranged from the boy's mother, Lee Na-yoon (Byun Jung-soo). At first alternately ignoring and teasing her, Jae-bin finds himself growing jealous when Sun-hee gets along with Dong-hwa, who unlike him, is gentle, kind and mature. Reminiscing about the good old days, Jae-bin recalls how beautiful Sun-hee was when they fell in love with each other 20 years ago. And in the present, he feels happy and relaxed with her, since he can be perfectly honest in front of her as an ordinary man, not as a famous actor who has to put on a show for the public. Thus, Jae-bin falls in love with Sun-hee all over again. He tries to show her in little ways: by having a hairstylist straighten out her unflattering perm into a stylish bob cut, buying her some nice clothes, and even paying for her laser eye surgery so that she'll be able to take off her thick, horn-rimmed glasses. But more than restoring her outer beauty, he also hopes to heal her emotional scars.

Cast

Main characters
Choi Jin-sil as Hong Sun-hee
Jung Joon-ho as Jang Dong-chul/Song Jae-bin
Jung Woong-in as Jang Dong-hwa
Byun Jung-soo as Lee Na-yoon

Supporting characters
Kim Byung-se as Ahn Yoo-shik
Han Bo-bae as Ahn Ji-min, Sun-hee's daughter
Kim Hyung-ja as Jung Geum-ja
Kim Chung as Go Jung-sook
Lee Young-ja as Min-joo's mother
Uhm Soo-jung as Ahn Yoo-jung
Ahn Il-kwon as Seo Won-tak
Lee Sang-hoon as Soo-ho
Hwang Jung-eum as Sa Ruby
Lee In-sung as Jang Hoon, Dong-hwa's son
Choi Jung-yoon as Kim Min-hee (cameo, ep 16)
Kim Mi-jin

Production
"Ajumma" is the Korean word for middle-aged, married women (usually housewives), and they were previously portrayed on the small and big screen as unfashionable, aggressive or hot-tempered, and self-sacrificing.

Screenwriter Moon Hee-jung said the heroine she wrote was positive – Sun-hee is hardworking, brave and intelligent – because "the spiritedness of modern ajumma does not just include rebelling against their mothers-in-law. They contain a progressive spirit."

Calling the series a "trendy ajumma drama," director Lee Tae-gon said that he wanted to portray "the romance of people who believe their good days are over."

Lead actress Choi Jin-sil was perfect casting, as she was once the darling of Korean popular culture during the late 1980s through the 1990s, but a controversial marriage and divorce forced her into a five-year hiatus from acting, until she made a successful comeback with My Rosy Life in 2005. That role resurrected her career; she was no longer the girl-next-door, but had reinvented her image into someone more approachable – an ajumma. At the drama press conference, Choi said, "As an actress, it may be natural to want a role that is glamorous and pretty, but I'm more comfortable with acting as an ordinary person. Reality is an important factor in dramas, and so I wanted to portray the life of a real person. I am an ajumma myself. I think Korean ajumma are fearless. They are not afraid of anything. Although the character goes through emotional downfalls, she doesn't give up. I think it is courage that defines ajumma."

In a December 2009 interview, actor Jung Joon-ho admitted that it was Choi Jin-sil who convinced him to take the role. He had initially passed on the role, but Choi personally went to one of his filming locations and told him that she wanted to collaborate with him in this drama. Touched by her sincerity, Jung accepted the offer. And when the first episode received ratings much lower than what both stars had expected, Choi comforted Jung, telling him not to lose hope, saying they would start from the bottom and work their way up. (After several episodes, the ratings did increase.) Jung said that Choi had a positive influence on the production, and working with her on this series left him the deepest and most unforgettable memories in his acting career.

Reception
Last Scandal recorded fairly successful ratings in the 19 percent range. Fans coined a new term: "jumderella syndrome," a portmanteau of the words ajumma and Cinderella, describing the onscreen fantasy that an ajumma can still be Cinderella and live happily ever after with her Prince Charming. Despite some criticism of Sun-hee's unrealistic transformation from a dowdy housewife, the ratings reflected that the story of an ajumma having a second chance at romance found resonance among viewers, especially middle-aged women.

Because of the series' success, a second season was planned with Choi and Jung reprising their roles, which would have begun filming in November 2008. However, Choi committed suicide on October 2, 2008.

While accepting his award for Top Excellence in Acting at the MBC Drama Awards ceremony in December 2008, Jung Joon-ho spoke in a melancholy tone as he expressed his heartfelt thanks to the production crew. He dedicated his award to the late Choi Jin-sil, saying he really wished he could see the smile on her face. Choi posthumously received the Best Contribution Award, which Jung accepted on her behalf and presented to her family during a tribute to her in January 2009.

Netizens have commented that the drama series shares some similarities to Choi's life, in that she was also mistreated by her ex-husband Cho Sung-min, which led to their divorce. But in real life, there was no "prince charming" to come and save her. In a figurative sense, this series was the "last scandal" or the last drama of Choi's life.

Awards and nominations

Trivia
Four of the actors, Jung Joon-ho, Jung Woong-in, Lee In-sung, and Lee Soo-ho, also appear together in the 2009 film City of Damnation.

Notes

References

External links
  
 Last Scandal at MBC Global Media
 
 
 Last Scandal official Japanese website 

MBC TV television dramas
AZN Television original programming
2008 South Korean television series debuts
2008 South Korean television series endings
Korean-language television shows
South Korean romantic comedy television series
Television series by Logos Film